Bionnus or Bionnos was a town and polis (city-state) of ancient Crete. It is known by epigraphic evidence. In a list of theorodokoi of Delphi from 230–210 BCE, Bionnus is mentioned between Psycheion and Matala.

References

Populated places in ancient Crete
Former populated places in Greece
Cretan city-states